|}

The Grand Military Gold Cup is a National Hunt steeplechase in England which is open to horses aged five years or older. It is run at Sandown Park over a distance of about 3 miles (3 miles and 37 yards or ), and it is scheduled to take place each year in March.

The race was first run in 1841 and the 150th running took place in 2013.

The race is restricted to (currently serving) military amateur riders.  Ownership of the horses in the race was also limited to serving or ex-serving members of the armed forces prior to 2023, when the race conditions were changed to remove the restriction.
A similar race, the Royal Artillery Gold Cup, is run at Sandown in February.

Winners since 1949
{| class = "sortable wikitable"
|- bgcolor="#77dd77" align="center"
! style="width:36px" | Year
! style="width:160px" | Winner
! style="width:30px" | Age
! style="width:180px" | Jockey
! style="width:180px" | Trainer
|-
|1949||Demon Vino||7||J Phillips||R Brignall Major
|-
|1950||Klaxton||10||Capt W Gibson||Ivor Anthony
|-
|1951||Klaxton||11||Capt W Gibson||Ivor Anthony
|-
|1952||Klaxton||12||Capt W Gibson||Ivor Anthony
|-
|1953||Atom Bomb||9||Maj P Fielden||C Mitchell 
|-
|1954||Pointsman||6||Maj C Blacker||A Kilpatrick
|-
|1955||Skatealong||7||Maj P Fielden||C Mitchell
|-
|1956||Cottage Lace||9||Capt W Gibson||R Turnell
|-
|1957||Easter Breeze||9||Maj R Dill||Harry Thomson Jones
|-
|1958||Stalbridge Park||8||Sir Nicholas Nuttall||A Kilpatrick
|-
|1959||Golden Drop||8||Capt P Upton||C Mitchell 
|-
|1960||Joan's Rival||6||Capt Piers Bengough||A Kilpatrick
|-
|1961||Stalbridge Park||11||Sir Nicholas Nuttall||A Kilpatrick
|-
|1962||Cash Desire||7||Maj P Greenwood||H Smyth
|-
|1963||Baxter||7||Lord Fermoy||A O'Brien (Ir)
|-
|1964||Threepwood||11||Capt N Ansell||N Ansell
|-
|1965||Rueil||8||B Leigh||Tim Forster
|-
|1966||Willow King||11||C Perry||J Barratt
|-
|1967||Indian Spice||7||Capt J Powell||Fred Winter
|-
|1968||Ballyverine||8||Capt G Nicoll         ||Ken Cundell
|-bgcolor="#eeeeee"
|1969Abandoned because of waterlogged state of course
|-
|1970||Charles Dickens||6||Maj Piers Bengough  ||A Kilpatrick
|-
|1971||Charles Dickens||7||Maj Piers Bengough||A Kilpatrick
|-
|1972||Charles Dickens||8||Lt Col Piers Bengough ||A Kilpatrick
|-
|1973||Ziguenor||11||Maj D Chesney           ||D Chesney
|-
|1974||Pakie||9||Maj Andrew Parker Bowles   ||Fulke Walwyn        
|-bgcolor="#eeeeee"
|1975Abandoned because of waterlogged state of course
|-
|1976||Lucky Edgar||11||Capt A Cramsie    ||Lord Ullswater
|-
|1977||Double Bridal||6||Capt C Price    ||Fulke Walwyn         
|-
|1978||Mr Snowman||9||C Sample                  ||Tim Forster
|-
|1979||Ten Up||12||Capt J Hodges           ||Capt J Hodges
|-
|1980||Beeno||8||Broderick Munro-Wilson||Broderick Munro-Wilson 
|-
|1981||The Drunken Duck||8||Broderick Munro-Wilson||Broderick Munro-Wilson
|-
|1982||Ballyross||11||Maj C Price||Tim Forster
|-
|1983||Burnt Oak||7||Col A Cramsie||David Nicholson
|-
|1984||Special Cargo||11||Gerald Oxley||Fulke Walwyn
|-
|1985||Special Cargo||12||Gerald Oxley||Fulke Walwyn
|-
|1986||Special Cargo||13||Gerald Oxley||Fulke Walwyn
|-
|1987||Burnt Oak||11||Mr P Nicholson || David Nicholson
|-
| 1988
| Columbus
| 11
| Maj C Lane
| Fulke Walwyn
|-
| 1989
| Brother Geoffrey
| 10
| Capt A Smith-Maxwell
| David Nicholson
|-
| 1990
| The Argonaut
| 12
| Mr Gerald Oxley
| Fulke Walwyn
|-
| 1991
| Brunton Park
| 13
| Capt C Ward Thomas
| John Jenkins
|-
| 1992
| Gunner Stream
| 8
| Mr B Marquis
| Richard Holder
|-
| 1993
| On The Other Hand
| 10
| Captain A Ogden
| Gordon W. Richards
|-
| 1994
| Quick Rapor
| 9
| Mr Dominic Alers-Hankey
| Richard Barber
|-
| 1995
| Country Member
| 10
| Maj Oliver Ellwood
| Andrew Turnell
|-
| 1996
| Norman Conqueror
| 11
| Maj Oliver Ellwood
| Tim Thomson Jones
|-
| 1997
| Act The Wag
| 8
| Capt A Ogden
| Martin Todhunter
|-
| 1998
| Silver Stick
| 11
| Mr Miles Watson
| Mick Easterby
|-
| 1999
| Court Melody
| 11
| Mr Dominic Alers-Hankey
| Paul Nicholls
|-
| 2000
| Camitrov
| 10
| Mr R Sturgis
| Nicky Henderson
|-
| 2001
| Kings Mistral
| 8
| Mr H Norton
| Patrick Chamings
|-
| 2002
| Folly Road
| 12
| Mr J Snowden
| D Williams
|-
| 2003
| Kings Mistral
| 10
| Lt A Michael
| Patrick Chamings
|-
| 2004
| Mercato
| 8
| Capt R T Sturgis
| John Best
|-
| 2005
| Whitenzo
| 9
| Capt J Snowden
| Paul Nicholls
|-
| 2006
| Inca Trail
| 10
| Capt J Snowden
| Paul Nicholls
|-
| 2007
| Hoo La Baloo
| 6
| Capt J Snowden
| Paul Nicholls
|-
| 2008
| Bolachoir
| 6
| Capt A Michael
| Patrick Chamings
|-
| 2009
| Oakfield Legend
| 8
| LBdr Sally Randell
| Pip Payne
|-
| 2010
| Scots Dragoon
| 8
| Maj A Michael
| Nicky Henderson
|-
| 2011
| Blu Teen
| 11
| LBdr Jody Sole
| D J Staddon
|-
| 2012
| Masked Man
| 9
| Capt Harry Wallace
| Charlie Mann
|-
| 2013
| Merrion Square
| 7
| LBdr Jody Sole
| Paul Nicholls
|-
| 2014
| Bradley
| 10
| LBdr Sally Randell
| Fergal O'Brien
|-
| 2015
| Loose Chips
| 9
| Miss Sally Randell
| Charlie Longsdon
|-
| 2016
| Jennys Surprise
| 8
| Lt Col Erica Bridge
| Fergal O'Brien
|-
| 2017
| Rathlin Rose
| 9
| Capt Guy Disney
| David Pipe
|-
| 2018
| Baden
| 7
| Lt Billy Aprahamian
| Nicky Henderson
|-
| 2019
| Le Reve
| 11
| LBdr Jody Sole
| Lucy Wadham
|- bgcolor="#eeeeee"
|2020Abandoned because of waterlogged state of course. 
|-bgcolor="#eeeeee"
| 2021no race 2021 
|-
| 2022
| Rolling Dylan
| 11
|  Maj Charlie O'Shea
| Philip Hobbs
|-
| 2023
| Broken Halo
| 8
| LBdr Jody Sole
| Paul Nicholls
|}

See also
Horse racing in Great Britain
List of British National Hunt races

References

Racing Post:
, 

Sandown Park Racecourse
National Hunt chases
National Hunt races in Great Britain
Recurring sporting events established in 1841
1841 establishments in England